Ganemat Sekhon (born 29 November 2000) is an Indian sport shooter from Chandigarh. She specializes in skeet. She won India a medal in the Women's skeet event of ISSF Shooting World Cup in March 2021. Sekhon is right handed and is right eye dominant.

Early life 
Sekhon is born at Chandigarh, a union territory of India on 29 November 2000.

Career 
Sekhon began shooting in 2015 on the instruction of her father Amrinder Singh when she was 15. She made her international debut at the ISSF Junior World Cup in 2016 at Suhl in which she placed 33.

In 2018, she become the first Indian female skeet shooter to win a medal at the Junior ISSF World Championship at Sydney, Australia when she won the bronze. She won the Asian Championships silver medal in 2019. Sekhon won bronze in the 2021 ISSF Shooting World Cup Women's Skeet event at New Delhi, the first for India in a women's event.

At the 2021 ISSF Junior World Championships, Sekhon won gold and silver in the Women's Skeet team and individual event, respectively.

References 

Indian female sport shooters
2000 births
Living people
Skeet shooters
People from Chandigarh
Shooters at the 2018 Asian Games
Asian Games competitors for India